An Focal is the University of Limerick’s only student newspaper, run by the University of Limerick Students' Union. The newspaper was first published in 1992.

Awards

Oxygen.ie Student Media Awards
People's Choice Award 2011 - Under editor Finn McDuffie.
People's Choice Award 2017 - Under editor Paul Saunders.
Website of the year 2019 - Under editor Christine Costello. 

TV3 National Media Awards
Student Newspaper of the Year - Under Editor Finn McDuffie.

Notable contributors

References

External links
An Focal - official website

Student newspapers published in the Republic of Ireland
University of Limerick